Decorator can refer to:
 A house painter and decorator
 Interior decoration
 Decorator pattern in object-oriented programming
 Function decorators, in Python
 The Decorator, a 1920 film starring Oliver Hardy
 It is like an Interior Designer